Anjali Monteiro is a documentary filmmaker, media educator and researcher who lives in Mumbai. She is currently Professor and Dean at the School of Media and Cultural Studies, Tata Institute of Social Sciences. Jointly with K.P. Jayasankar, she has made around thirty-five documentary films on various subjects.

Biography
Anjali Monteiro was born in Pune, Maharashtra (on July 13). Her parents were Inocencio Gracias Monteiro, an army engineer and Sofia Cordeiro Monteiro, a school teacher, both from Goa. She completed her bachelor's degree in Psychology from Sophia College for Women, Bombay University in 1975 and her master's degree in Economics from Gokhale Institute of Politics and Economics, Pune University in 1977. She completed her Ph.D. in Sociology from Goa University and the Centre for the Study of Developing Societies, under the guidance of noted scholar Professor Ashis Nandy in 1994.  She taught at the undergraduate level and then was involved in development communication work between 1979 and 1983 at the Xavier Institute of Communications, Mumbai. She married her colleague K.P. Jayasankar in 1989 and they have a daughter.

Teaching
Monteiro joined the Tata Institute of Social Sciences in 1983 and set up the Audio-Visual Unit, which is now the School of Media and Cultural Studies. Monteiro has been a visiting faculty at several media and design schools and Universities, in India and overseas, including University of California, Berkeley, University of Technology, Sydney, and Lahti Institute of Design, Finland, among others.

Research
Monteiro's doctoral work, entitled State, Subject and the Text: The Construction of Meaning in Television, supervised by Prof. Ashis Nandy, involved an ethnographic study of television audience reception in a working-class neighbourhood in Goa, in the late 1980s.  She currently writes in the broad area of media and cultural studies, with focus on documentary film, censorship, critical theory and issues of media representation.

Filmography
(Co-directed with K.P. Jayasankar)

Selected publications 
2020 Anjali Monteiro, K.P. Jayasankar and Amit Rai, DigiNaka: Subaltern Politics and Digital Media in Post-Capitalist India, Orient Blackswan.
2018 Faiz Ullah, Anjali Monteiro and K.P. Jayasankar, DiverCity- Independent Documentary as an Alternate Narrative of the City, in Devasundaram, A.E. (ed) Indian Cinema Beyond Bollywood: The New Independent Cinema Revolution, Routledge	
2016  K.P. Jayasankar and Anjali Monteiro, A Fly in The Curry: Independent Documentary in India, Sage, 2016. Won Special Mention 64th National Film Awards#Golden Lotus Award for best book on cinema category.
2012 Anjali Monteiro and K.P. Jayasankar, Resisting Censorship in India, East Asia Forum Quarterly, Vol 4, No. 1.
2010 Anjali Monteiro K.P. Jayasankar, A New Pair of Scissors- the Draft Cinematograph Bill, Economic and Political Weekly, July 17, 2010
2009  K.P. Jayasankar and Anjali Monteiro,  Jai Ho Shanghai: The Invisible Poor in Slumdog Millionaire, in Kaldor, Mary et al. (eds) Global Civil Society Yearbook of the London School of Economics, Sage, London
2005 K.P. Jayasankar and Anjali Monteiro, Censorship ke Peeche Kya Hai, in Nalini Rajan (ed) Practising Journalism, Sage, London
2003 K.P. Jayasankar and Anjali Monteiro, The Plot Thickens – A Cultural Studies Approach to Media Education in India, in Tony Lavender, Birgitte Tufte and Dafna Lemish (eds.) Global Trends in Media Education, Hampton Press.
2001 K.P. Jayasankar and Anjali Monteiro, Documentary and Ethnographic Film, Elsevier Encyclopaedia of Social and Behavioural Sciences, Elsevier.
2000 K.P. Jayasankar and Anjali Monteiro, Between the Normal and the Imaginary – The Spectator-self, the Other and Satellite Television in India, in Hagen, I and Wasko, J.(eds) Consuming Audiences: Production and Reception in Media Research, Hampton Press.
1998 Anjali Monteiro, Official Television and Unofficial Fabrications of the Self: The Spectator as Subject in Nandy, Ashis (ed.), The Secret Politics of  Our Desires, OUP.
1993 K.P. Jayasankar and Anjali Monteiro, The Spectator-Indian – An Exploratory Study of the Reception of News, Cultural Studies 10 (1).

Awards and recognition
2013- Jayasankar's film Saacha (The Loom), co-directed with Anjali Monteiro was a part of the installation, Project Space: Word. Sound. Power. Tate Modern, London, as well as at Kochi-Muziris Biennale.
2018 -Around 30 national and international awards to his films include Our Family.
2008- Certificate of Merit and Special Mention of the Jury, at MIFF.
2013- So Heddan So Hoddan won the Basil – Wright Award at RAI International Ethnographic Film Festival in
2019- A Delicate Weave, which received the Jury's commendation, Intangible culture film prize, 16th Royal Anthropological Institute Festival at Bristol, UK.

References

External links

https://indianculturalforum.in/2020/03/17/a-metropolis-of-contradictions-bombay-through-saacha/
https://indianculturalforum.in/2019/10/31/builders-of-your-grand-edifice-the-memories-of-narayan-surve/
https://indianculturalforum.in/authors/bharathy-singaravel-in-conversation-with-anjali-monteiro-and-kp-jayasankar/

Living people
People from Mumbai
Film directors from Mumbai
Indian documentary filmmakers
21st-century Indian film directors
Indian civil rights activists
20th-century Indian film directors
Year of birth missing (living people)